Denham Island is an islet north of Sonora Island (British Columbia) in Cordero Channel, near the mouth of Bute Inlet in British Columbia, Canada.

It was named after Admiral Henry Mangles Denham, a noted Royal Navy surveyor, by Captain Pender, master RN in 1864.

References

Central Coast of British Columbia
Islands of the Discovery Islands
History of British Columbia
Maritime history of Canada